Green fairy may refer to:
 Absinthe, an alcoholic beverage
 The Green Fairy Book (1892) in the series Lang's Fairy Books
 Fern the Green Fairy, one of the Rainbow Fairies in the Rainbow Magic books
 A person who supplies medical cannabis illegally in New Zealand